The Union for Homeland is a political party in Libya, founded in 2012. It is mainly based in Misrata District. The party is led by Abdulrahman Sewehli, a prominent opponent of former leader Muammar Gaddafi. The Union advocates strong decentralisation of power on a local level, but rejects federalism. It proposes a semi-presidential system modelled on the French one. The Union for Homeland calls for a consequent break with the old regime and wants to ban figures who held ranks during Gaddafi's government from political influence.

The party won two seats in the Libyan General National Congress election of 2012.

External links
Official website (Arabic)

References

Political parties in Libya
Political parties established in 2012
2012 establishments in Libya